Al-Sultan Dhinei Kalaminjaa Siri Fennaadheettha Mahaa Radun (Dhivehi: އައްސުލްޠާން ދިނެއި ކަލަމިންޖާ ސިރީ ފެންނާތަ މަހާރަދުން) was the Sultan of Maldives from 1193 to 1199. He was the son of Fathahiriya Maavaa Kilege (Dhivehi: ފަތަހިރިޔާ މާވާކިލެގެ). He ruled the country for 7 years until his death in 1199. He was succeeded by his younger brother, Dhihei of Maldives.

1199 deaths
12th-century sultans of the Maldives